James Ikechukwu Esomugha, popularly known as Jim Iyke  (born 25 September 1976), is a Nigerian actor and one of the stars of the movie Last Flight to Abuja alongside Omotola Jalade Ekeinde and Hakeem Kae-Kazim.

Early life and education
He was born in Libreville, Gabon. His parents, from Ogwugwu Village in Enugwu-Agidi town of Anambra State, changed their name from Okolue to Esomugha. He is the only boy in a family of eight children. He attended secondary school in F. G. C. Kwali Abuja from 1985 to 1991, then earned a diploma in Banking and Finance and a BSc in philosophy from the University of Jos, Plateau State.

Career
Jim Iyke began acting in 2001. , he was one of the highest paid actors in Nollywood, he has appeared in over 150 films. 

He started a movie production company, Untamed Productions in 2007, and also has his own music record label, Untamed Records. His first album, titled Who Am I?, featured some of Nigeria's top musicians, such as TuFace Idibia and Sound Sultan.

Controversy
A video of Jim Iyke's purported 'deliverance' from an evil spirit at The Synagogue Church of All Nations, led by Pastor T.B. Joshua, provoked intense debate on social media. The spirit reportedly confessed that it was behind Iyke's inability to find a wife.

Philanthropy
He is the founder of Jim Iyke Foundation for Children with Special Disabilities. He visited Kenya in December 2012 in support of the Make a Change Campaign, a charity project founded by Christopher Grey and Jamaican dance hall artist Cécile.

Personal life 
Iyke holds a black belt in taekwondo.

In April 2019, he announced the birth of his son.

Filmography

Awards and nominations

References

External links
 
 
 

1970 births
Living people
Nigerian male film actors
People from Libreville
21st-century Nigerian male actors
University of Jos alumni
Actors from Anambra State
Igbo actors
Nigerian film producers
Nigerian film award winners